National standards may refer to:

Standards by government bodies
 Chinese National Standards 
 Guobiao standards, the standards issued by the Standardization Administration of China (People's Republic of China)
 Russian National Standards
 Vietnamese National Standards

Standards by national organizations
 American National Standards Institute
 Brazilian National Standards Organization
 British Standards, the standards issued by BSI Group
 National Standards Authority of Ireland

See also
 National reference standard, a measurement standard
 Standard (disambiguation)
 Standards organization